The Huge Hefner Chronicles is the third studio album by American producer/MC Diamond D. Released on October 14, 2008, this album is different from his previous works in the way that it features a wide range of different producers rather than Diamond crafting the beats himself like on previous releases. Diamond says the inspiration to do make an album with other producers came from the late producer/MC J Dilla who made a similar album, Pay Jay, for MCA Records that got scrapped. '''''

Track listing

Album singles

2008 albums
Diamond D albums
Babygrande Records albums
Albums produced by DJ Scratch
Albums produced by Diamond D
Albums produced by Illmind
Albums produced by Nottz